Arthur Trevenen Coode (5 February 1876 – 28 December 1940) was an English first-class cricketer active 1898–1901 who played for Middlesex. He was born in St Helier, Jersey and died in Hazlemere.

References

1876 births
1940 deaths
English cricketers
Middlesex cricketers
Cambridge University cricketers
Marylebone Cricket Club cricketers